Area 18 can refer to:

 Area 18 (Nevada National Security Site)
 Brodmann area 18